In nuclear physics and particle physics, isospin (I) is a quantum number related to the up- and down quark content of the particle. More specifically, isospin symmetry is a subset of the flavour symmetry seen more broadly in the interactions of baryons and mesons.

The name of the concept contains the term spin because its quantum mechanical description is mathematically similar to that of angular momentum (in particular, in the way it couples; for example, a proton–neutron pair can be coupled either in a state of total isospin 1 or in one of 0). But unlike angular momentum, it is a dimensionless quantity and is not actually any type of spin.

Etymologically, the term was derived from isotopic spin, a confusing term to which nuclear physicists prefer isobaric spin, which is more precise in meaning. Before the concept of quarks was introduced, particles that are affected equally by the strong force but had different charges (e.g. protons and neutrons) were considered different states of the same particle, but having isospin values related to the number of charge states. A close examination of isospin symmetry ultimately led directly to the discovery and understanding of quarks and to the development of Yang–Mills theory. Isospin symmetry remains an important concept in particle physics.

Quark content and isospin 
In the modern formulation, isospin is defined as a vector quantity in which up and down quarks have a value of  = 1/2, with the 3rd-component (3) being +1/2 for up quarks, and −1/2 for down quarks, while all other quarks have  = 0. Therefore, for hadrons in general, where u and d are the numbers of up and down quarks respectively,
 

In any combination of quarks, the 3rd component of the isospin vector (3) could either be aligned between a pair of quarks, or face the opposite direction, giving different possible values for total isospin for any combination of quark flavours. Hadrons with the same quark content but different total isospin can be distinguished experimentally, verifying that flavour is actually a vector quantity, not a scalar (up vs down simply being a projection in the quantum mechanical  axis of flavour space).

For example, a strange quark can be combined with an up and a down quark to form a baryon, but there are two different ways the isospin values can combine either adding (due to being flavour-aligned) or cancelling out (due to being in opposite flavour directions). The isospin-1 state (the ) and the isospin-0 state (the ) have different experimentally detected masses and half-lives.

Isospin and symmetry

Isospin is regarded as a symmetry of the strong interaction under the action of the Lie group SU(2), the two states being the up flavour and down flavour. In quantum mechanics, when a Hamiltonian has a symmetry, that symmetry manifests itself through a set of states that have the same energy (the states are described as being degenerate). In simple terms, the energy operator for the strong interaction gives the same result when an up quark and an otherwise identical down quark are swapped around.

Like the case for regular spin, the isospin operator I is vector-valued: it has three components Ix, Iy, Iz, which are coordinates in the same 3-dimensional vector space where the 3 representation acts. Note that this vector space has nothing to do with the physical space, except similar mathematical formalism. Isospin is described by two quantum numbers:  the total isospin, and 3 an eigenvalue of the Iz projection for which flavor states are eigenstates, . In other words, each 3 state specifies certain flavor state of a multiplet. The third coordinate, to which the "3" subscript refers, is chosen due to notational conventions that relate bases in 2 and 3 representation spaces. Namely, for the spin-1/2 case, components of I are equal to Pauli matrices divided by 2, and so Iz =  3, where

 

While the forms of these matrices are isomorphic to those of spin, these Pauli matrices only act within the Hilbert space of isospin, not that of spin, and therefore is common to denote them with τ rather than σ to avoid confusion.

Although isospin symmetry is actually very slightly broken, SU(3) symmetry is more badly broken, due to the much higher mass of the strange quark compared to the up and down. The discovery of charm, bottomness and topness could lead to further expansions up to SU(6) flavour symmetry, which would hold if all six quarks were identical. However, the very much larger masses of the charm, bottom, and top quarks means that SU(6) flavour symmetry is very badly broken in nature (at least at low energies), and assuming this symmetry leads to qualitatively and quantitatively incorrect predictions. In modern applications, such as lattice QCD, isospin symmetry is often treated as exact for the three light quarks (uds), while the three heavy quarks (cbt) must be treated separately.

Hadron nomenclature

Hadron nomenclature is based on isospin.
 Particles of total isospin 3/2 are named Delta baryons and can be made by a combination of any three up or down quarks (but only up or down quarks).
 Particles of total isospin 1 can be made from two up quarks, two down quarks, or one of each:
 certain mesons further differentiated by total spin into pions (total spin 0) and rho mesons (total spin 1)
 with an additional quark of higher flavour Sigma baryons
 Particles of total isospin 1/2 can be made from:
 a single up or down quark together with an additional quark of higher flavour strange (kaons), charm (D meson), or bottom (B meson)
 a single up or down quark together with two additional quarks of higher flavour Xi baryon
 an up quark, a down quark, and either an up or a down quark nucleons. Note that three identical quarks would be forbidden by the Pauli exclusion principle due to requirement of anti-symmetric wave function
 Particles of total isospin 0 can be made from
 a neutral quark-antiquark pair:  or  eta mesons
 one up quark and one down quark, with an additional quark of higher flavour Lambda baryons
 anything not involving any up or down quarks

History

Original motivation for isospin

Isospin was introduced as a concept in 1932, well before the 1960s development of the quark model. The man who introduced it, Werner Heisenberg, did so to explain symmetries of the then newly discovered neutron (symbol n):
 The mass of the neutron and the proton (symbol p) are almost identical: they are nearly degenerate, and both are thus often called nucleons. Although the proton has a positive electric charge, and the neutron is neutral, they are almost identical in all other aspects.
 The strength of the strong interaction between any pair of nucleons is the same, independent of whether they are interacting as protons or as neutrons.

This behavior is not unlike the electron, where there are two possible states based on their spin. Other properties of the particle are conserved in this case. Heisenberg introduced the concept of another conserved quantity that would cause the proton to turn into a neutron and vice versa. In 1937, Eugene Wigner introduced the term "isospin" to indicate how the new quantity is similar to spin in behavior, but otherwise unrelated.

Protons and neutrons were then grouped together as nucleons because they both have nearly the same mass and interact in nearly the same way, if the (much weaker) electromagnetic interaction is neglected. In particle physics, the near mass-degeneracy of the neutron and proton points to an approximate symmetry of the Hamiltonian describing the strong interactions. It was thus convenient to treat them as being different states of the same particle.

Heisenberg's particular contribution was to note that the mathematical formulation of this symmetry was in certain respects similar to the mathematical formulation of spin, whence the name "isospin" derives. The neutron and the proton are assigned to the doublet (the spin-1/2, 2, or fundamental representation) of SU(2). The pions are assigned to the triplet (the spin-1, 3, or adjoint representation) of SU(2). Though there is a difference from the theory of spin: the group action does not preserve flavor (specifically, the group action is an exchange of flavour).

Similar to a spin-1/2 particle, which has two states, protons and neutrons were said to be of isospin 1/2. The proton and neutron were then associated with different isospin projections I3 = +1/2 and −1/2 respectively.

Although the neutron does in fact have a slightly higher mass due to isospin breaking (this is now understood to be due to the difference in the masses of the up and down quarks and the effects of the electromagnetic interaction), the appearance of an approximate symmetry is useful even if it does not exactly hold; the small symmetry breakings can be described by a perturbation theory, which gives rise to slight differences between the near-degenerate states.

When constructing a physical theory of nuclear forces, one could simply assume that it does not depend on isospin, although the total isospin should be conserved.

The particle zoo 

These considerations would also prove useful in the analysis of meson-nucleon interactions after the discovery of the pions in 1947. By assuming that isospin was conserved by nuclear interactions, the new mesons were more easily accommodated by nuclear theory.

As further particles were discovered, they were assigned into isospin multiplets according to the number of different charge states seen: 2 doublets  of K mesons,, a triplet  of Sigma baryons, a singlet  Lambda baryon, a quartet  Delta baryons, and so on.

The power of isospin symmetry and related methods comes from the observation that families of particles with similar masses tend to correspond to the invariant subspaces associated with the irreducible representations of the Lie algebra SU(2). In this context, an invariant subspace is spanned by basis vectors which correspond to particles in a family. Under the action of the Lie algebra SU(2), which generates rotations in isospin space, elements corresponding to definite particle states or superpositions of states can be rotated into each other, but can never leave the space (since the subspace is in fact invariant). This is reflective of the symmetry present. The fact that unitary matrices will commute with the Hamiltonian means that the physical quantities calculated do not change even under unitary transformation. In the case of isospin, this machinery is used to reflect the fact that the mathematics of the strong force behaves the same if a proton and neutron are swapped around (in the modern formulation, the up and down quark).

An example: Delta baryons

For example, the particles known as the Delta baryons baryons of spin 3/2 were grouped together because they all have nearly the same mass (approximately ) and interact in nearly the same way.

They could be treated as the same particle, with the difference in charge being due to the particle being in different states. Isospin was introduced in order to be the variable that defined this difference of state. In an analogue to spin, an isospin projection (denoted ) is associated to each charged state; since there were four Deltas, four projections were needed. Like spin, isospin projections were made to vary in increments of 1. Hence, in order to have four increments of 1, an isospin value of 3/2 is required (giving the projections ).

In the isospin picture, the four Deltas and the two nucleons were thought to simply be the different states of two particles. The Delta baryons are now understood to be made of a mix of three up and down quarks uuu, uud, udd, and ddd; the difference in charge being difference in the charges of up and down quarks (+ e and − e respectively); yet, they can also be thought of as the excited states of the nucleons.

Gauged isospin symmetry 

Attempts have been made to promote isospin from a global to a local symmetry. In 1954, Chen Ning Yang and Robert Mills suggested that the notion of protons and neutrons, which are continuously rotated into each other by isospin, should be allowed to vary from point to point. To describe this, the proton and neutron direction in isospin space must be defined at every point, giving local basis for isospin. A gauge connection would then describe how to transform isospin along a path between two points.

This Yang–Mills theory describes interacting vector bosons, like the photon of electromagnetism. Unlike the photon, the SU(2) gauge theory would contain self-interacting gauge bosons. The condition of gauge invariance suggests that they have zero mass, just as in electromagnetism.

Ignoring the massless problem, as Yang and Mills did, the theory makes a firm prediction: the vector particle should couple to all particles of a given isospin universally. The coupling to the nucleon would be the same as the coupling to the kaons. The coupling to the pions would be the same as the self-coupling of the vector bosons to themselves.

When Yang and Mills proposed the theory, there was no candidate vector boson. J. J. Sakurai in 1960 predicted that there should be a massive vector boson which is coupled to isospin, and predicted that it would show universal couplings. The rho mesons were discovered a short time later, and were quickly identified as Sakurai's vector bosons. The couplings of the rho to the nucleons and to each other were verified to be universal, as best as experiment could measure. The fact that the diagonal isospin current contains part of the electromagnetic current led to the prediction of rho-photon mixing and the concept of vector meson dominance, ideas which led to successful theoretical pictures of GeV-scale photon-nucleus scattering.

The introduction of quarks

The discovery and subsequent analysis of additional particles, both mesons and baryons, made it clear that the concept of isospin symmetry could be broadened to an even larger symmetry group, now called flavor symmetry. Once the kaons and their property of strangeness became better understood, it started to become clear that these, too, seemed to be a part of an enlarged symmetry that contained isospin as a subgroup. The larger symmetry was named the Eightfold Way by Murray Gell-Mann, and was promptly recognized to correspond to the adjoint representation of SU(3). To better understand the origin of this symmetry, Gell-Mann proposed the existence of up, down and strange quarks which would belong to the fundamental representation of the SU(3) flavor symmetry.

In the quark model, the isospin projection (I3) followed from the up and down quark content of particles; uud for the proton and udd for the neutron. Technically, the nucleon doublet states are seen to be linear combinations of products of 3-particle isospin doublet states and spin doublet states. That is, the (spin-up) proton wave function, in terms of quark-flavour eigenstates, is described by

and the (spin-up) neutron by

Although these superpositions are the technically correct way of denoting a proton and neutron in terms of quark flavour and spin eigenstates, for brevity, they are often simply referred to as "uud" and "udd". The derivation above assumes exact isospin symmetry and is modified by SU(2)-breaking terms.

Similarly, the isospin symmetry of the pions are given by:

Although the discovery of the quarks led to reinterpretation of mesons as a vector bound state of a quark and an antiquark, it is sometimes still useful to think of them as being the gauge bosons of a hidden local symmetry.

Weak isospin

Isospin is similar to, but should not be confused with weak isospin. Briefly, weak isospin is the gauge symmetry of the weak interaction which connects quark and lepton doublets of left-handed particles in all generations; for example, up and down quarks, top and bottom quarks, electrons and electron neutrinos. By contrast (strong) isospin connects only up and down quarks, acts on both chiralities (left and right) and is a global (not a gauge) symmetry.

See also 
 Chan–Paton factor

Notes

References

External links 
 i8 iNuclear Structure and Decay Data - IAEA  Nuclides' Isospin

Baryons
Hadrons
Nuclear physics
Quarks
Flavour (particle physics)

he:איזוספין